Pontiac Northern High School was a public high school in Pontiac, Michigan. 
It was established on September 2, 1958, and was consolidated with Pontiac Central High School on June 12, 2009, to form Pontiac High School.  Pontiac High School had occupied the former Pontiac Northern High School building, which was built in 1958, the year Pontiac Northern was established.

Athletics
Pontiac Northern earned state championships in boys' track & field in 1990 and 1997 and in boys' basketball in 2001 and 2002.

Pontiac North also won the World Championship in robotics in 2003.

Notable alumni
Paul Haynes (class of 2000) – basketball player who was the SWAC Player of the Year in 2002

References

Educational institutions established in 1958
Educational institutions disestablished in 2009
Public high schools in Michigan
1958 establishments in Michigan